Harry Watt (1906–1987) was a film director.

Harry Watt may also refer to:

Harry Watt (politician) (1863–1929), British politician
Horrie Watt (1891–1969), also known as Harry, Australian rugby league player
 A Harry Watt drill-bit, a type of mortiser

See also
Harry Watts (1826–1913), sailor and diver
Harry Watts (jockey) (1894–1940), Canadian jockey
Henry Watt (disambiguation)

Watt, Harry